Euchromia rubricollis is a moth of the subfamily Arctiinae. It was described by Francis Walker in 1865. It is found on the New Hebrides and the Solomon Islands.

References

 

Moths described in 1865
Euchromiina